Garrick Cowley is a Rugby Union player. He previously played for Exeter Chiefs in the Aviva Premiership. He signed from Esher in the summer of 2010.

Personal life
Cowley was born to a Samoan father and a Pākehā European New Zealander mother. His sister Sarah Cowley is a track and field athlete who represented New Zealand at the 2012 Summer Olympics in the women's heptathlon event.

References

External links
 ESPNscrum Player Profile
 Exeter sign Garrick Cowley

1982 births
Bay of Plenty rugby union players
Exeter Chiefs players
Living people